Massachusetts Senate's Hampden district in the United States is one of 40 legislative districts of the Massachusetts Senate. It covers portions of Hampden county including most of the majority-minority precincts in Springfield, all of West Springfield, and a small portion of Chicopee . Democrat Adam Gomez of Springfield, Massachusetts has represented the district since 2021.

Locales represented
The district includes the following localities:
 part of Chicopee
 part of Springfield
 West Springfield

The current district geographic boundary overlaps with those of the Massachusetts House of Representatives' 6th Hampden, 7th Hampden, 8th Hampden, 9th Hampden, 10th Hampden, 11th Hampden, and 12th Hampden districts.

List of senators 

Amasa Holcomb, senator in 1852
 Stanley John Zarod, circa 1979

See also
 List of Massachusetts Senate elections
 List of Massachusetts General Courts
 List of former districts of the Massachusetts Senate
 Other Hampden County districts of the Massachusett Senate: Berkshire, Hampshire, Franklin, and Hampden; 1st Hampden and Hampshire; 2nd Hampden and Hampshire
 Hampden County districts of the Massachusetts House of Representatives: 1st, 2nd, 3rd, 4th, 5th, 6th, 7th, 8th, 9th, 10th, 11th, 12th

References

Further reading

External links
 Ballotpedia. Massachusetts State Senate Hampden District
 
 League of Women Voters of Northampton Area

Senate 
Government of Hampden County, Massachusetts
Massachusetts Senate